Robert Wilford "Bobby" Hewitson (January 23, 1892 – January 9, 1969) was a Canadian ice hockey official who worked as a referee in the National Hockey League from 1920 to 1934.

Career 
Hewiston worked as linesman in the National Hockey League from 1920 to 1934. He was also the first curator of the Hockey Hall of Fame in Toronto. In 1963, he was inducted into the Hockey Hall of Fame for his service to ice hockey.

External links

References 

1892 births
1969 deaths
Hockey Hall of Fame employees
Hockey Hall of Fame inductees
National Hockey League officials
Ice hockey people from Toronto